Settlement of Great Britain and Ireland may refer to:

Historical immigration to Great Britain
Plantations of Ireland, in 16th and 17th century land was confiscated by the English Crown and Commonwealth and which was then colonised by settlers from England and the Scottish Lowlands.
Plantation of Ulster,  the organised colonisation (plantation) of Ulster – a province of Ireland – by people from Scotland and England.
Immigration to the United Kingdom since 1922